is a passenger railway station located in  Higashi-ku, Sakai, Osaka Prefecture, Japan, operated by the private railway operator Nankai Electric Railway. It has the station number "NK63".

Lines

Layout
The station consists of two island platforms with an elevated station building.

Platforms

Adjacent stations

History
Kitanoda Station opened on August 7, 1914.

Passenger statistics
In fiscal 2019, the station was used by an average of 33,659 passengers daily.

Surrounding area
 Sakai City East Cultural Center
Sakai City East Library
Sakai City Tomiokahigashi Elementary School
 Sakai City Tomiokanishi Elementary School
 Noda Castle ruins

See also
 List of railway stations in Japan

References

External links

  

Railway stations in Japan opened in 1914
Railway stations in Osaka Prefecture
Sakai, Osaka